Thomas "Tim" Michael Desmond Gimlette (7 January 1927 – 16 November 2022) was a pioneer in the use of radioactive material in medicine.

References 

1927 births
2022 deaths
20th-century British medical doctors